This is a list of the past and present mayors of Newton, Massachusetts.

References

Newton